Kingsley Obiekwu (born 12 November 1974) is a retired Nigerian footballer who played as a defender. He represented Nigeria at international level and was a member of the squad which won the gold medal at the 1996 Olympics in Atlanta. He coached Ingas F.C. of Enugu, Nigeria, between 2009 and 2013, after a brief stint with Benin side, USS Kraké.

References

1974 births
Living people
Nigerian footballers
Nigeria international footballers
Association football defenders
Rangers International F.C. players
Go Ahead Eagles players
Al Ahli Club (Dubai) players
Al Masry SC players
Footballers at the 1996 Summer Olympics
Olympic medalists in football
Olympic footballers of Nigeria
Olympic gold medalists for Nigeria
Nigerian expatriate sportspeople in the United Arab Emirates
Medalists at the 1996 Summer Olympics
UAE Pro League players
USS Kraké managers
People from Igbuzo
Nigerian football managers